With Friends Like These... is a 1998 American comedy film directed by Philip Frank Messina and starring Robert Costanzo, Jon Tenney, David Strathairn and Adam Arkin. Bill Murray appears in a cameo.

Premise
Four small-time two-bit character actors (Costanzo, Tenney, Strathairn, and Arkin), all close friends, are competing for the same important part in the next Martin Scorsese mob film.

Cast
Adam Arkin as Steve Hersh
David Strathairn as Armand Minetti
Jon Tenney as Dorian Mastandrea
Robert Costanzo as Johnny DiMartino
Amy Madigan as Hannah DiMartino
Laura San Giacomo as Joanne Hersh
Elle Macpherson as Samantha Mastandrea
Lauren Tom as Yolanda Chin
Beverly D'Angelo as Theresa Carpenter
Ashley Peldon as Marissa DiMartino
Allison Bertolino as Dana DiMartino
Bill Murray as Maurice Melnick
Frederika Kesten as Catrice
Carmine Costanzo as Nino DiMartino 
Heather Stephens as Babette
Martin Scorsese as himself
Jon Polito as Rudy Ptak

External links
 
 
 

1998 films
1998 comedy films
American comedy films
American independent films
Films about actors
Films set in Los Angeles
Films produced by Robert Greenhut
Films scored by John Powell
1998 independent films
1990s English-language films
1990s American films